The 1997 NCAA Division I-AA football season, part of college football in the United States organized by the National Collegiate Athletic Association (NCAA) at the Division I-AA level, began in August 1997, and concluded with the 1997 NCAA Division I-AA Football Championship Game on December 20, 1997, at Finley Stadium in Chattanooga, Tennessee. The Youngstown State Penguins won their fourth I-AA championship, defeating the McNeese State Cowboys by a score of 10−9.

Conference changes and new programs
Due to rule changes regarding conference sports sponsorships, the membership of the old Yankee Conference shifted to the Atlantic 10 Conference prior to the 1997 season. All 12 members (Boston University, Connecticut, Delaware, James Madison, Maine, Massachusetts, New Hampshire, Northeastern, Rhode Island, Richmond, Villanova, and William & Mary) moved into the new conference.

Conference standings

Conference champions

Postseason

NCAA Division I-AA playoff bracket
The NCAA departed from standard bracket structure—where, for example, the fourth and fifth seeds could meet in the second round—in order to place teams from the same conference in different halves of the bracket.

* Denotes host institution

Source:

References